Charles Guillaume Alexandre Bourgeois (16 December 1759 – 7 May 1832) was a French physicist and painter.

As a painter, he's known by his gray camaïeux; some of his portraits are in the Musée du Louvre.

As a physicist, he was an important optician.  His two main works are: 
Leçons expérimentales d'optique sur la lumière et les couleurs destinées à rétablir dans leur intégrité les faits dénaturés par Newton (1816–1817)
Manuel d'optique expérimentale à l'usage des artistes et des physiciens (1821).

18th-century French painters
French male painters
19th-century French painters
French physicists
1759 births
1832 deaths
19th-century French male artists
18th-century French male artists